François Lempérière, born in 1926 in Cherbourg, is a French civil engineer who built and/or designed 15 dams in France and other countries. He invented solutions such as Fusegates, Piano Keys Weir, Twin Dams and Tidal Gardens. He received his education at Ecole Polytechnique and Ecole Nationale des Ponts et Chaussées.

Biography
François Lempérière has been a contractor along 40 years in GTM (Grands travaux de Marseille, later GTM Entrepose) where he was in charge from 1960 to 1985 of building large structures in rivers (Rhône, Rhine, Nile, Zambezi) (such as the Cabora Bassa Dam on the Zambezi) or at sea as the Saint-Nazaire Dry Dock in France where have been built the largest world tankers and ships. He was also involved in highways, canals and nuclear plants.

He was Chairman of GTM International and after 1982 Deputy General Manager of GTM Entrepose.

François Lempérière has patented 3 inventions for GTM Entrepose and its subsidiary Hydroplus.

Since 1976, he has been member of 5 Technical Committees of ICOLD, the International Commission on Large Dams, vice-Chairman of the Committee on Technology of Construction, and Chairman of the Committee on Cost of Dams. 
He drafted 8 ICOLD Bulletins about dams construction methods, costs and cost savings
.

He has been Chairman (1991-1995) of the French Committee on Large Dams now CFBR.

In 1997, he has founded with Pierre Londe the not profit International Association “HydroCoop”, which gives free advices especially on floods and dams, hydraulic and tidal energy and energy storage.

Commitment

Floods control during dams construction

F. Lempérière proposed innovative solutions for managing floods during dams construction.

Spillways for dams in operation

F. Lempérière has proposed 4 innovative solutions for the dams spillways. The solutions have applied to new dams or existing ones.

- 	In 1989 the “Fusegates” used for 70 dams in over 10 countries with fuse elements up to 8 m high and floods up to 20 000 m3/s.

- 	In 2003 with A. Ouamane  the “Piano Keys Weirs”, a more efficient labyrinth shape of spillways used for 30 dams in 10 countries.

- 	In 2008, the Concrete Fuse Plugs.

- 	In 2014, with A. Ouamane an innovative association of above optimized structures which increases fivefold the discharge of a traditional free flow spillway.

Tidal energy

F. Lempérière has been involved in studies of tidal power plants since 1975 (GEDEM for Électricité de France).
In 2014, he proposed an Innovative Solution, the “Tidal Gardens” which may extend the utilization of tidal energy beyond areas of very high tides. This solution has been studied by Electricité de France and presented to ICOLD Congress in 2015 and to ICOLD Awards in 2018.

Renewable energy and energy storage

Since 2009, F. Lempérière has presented various studies of the world energy problems and proposed two innovative solutions for energy storage: 

- “Twin Dams” associating two dams along a large river.

- “Emerald Lakes” creating dams at sea along a cliff.

F. Lempérière also proposed solutions for early reduction of fossil and nuclear energy.

Awards

In 1996, F. Lempérière was awarded by the French Academy of Sciences.

In the ICOLD congress of 2018, he received a special ICOLD Award for a “Life time Achievement”.

References

External links 
 http://www.hydrocoop.org, the website of the nonprofit Organization HydroCoop

French civil engineers
École Polytechnique alumni
École des Ponts ParisTech alumni
1926 births
Living people